MacLure, MacDonald & Co. were, in Victorian times, "Ornamental Printers to the Queen". They invented a power-driven lithographic printing press in 1853. They engraved and produced stamps for Uruguay (1866), Sarawak (1869 and 1875) and telephone stamps for Great Britain (1884). Next to stamps they produced prints. The company was founded in 1835 and was acquired in 1992 by J R Reid Printers of Blantyre, South Lanarkshire.

History
Andrew MacLure and Archibald Gray MacDonald set up business as engravers and lithographic printers in Glasgow in 1835. Their first premises were in Trongate but by 1851 they had moved to 57 Buchanan Street, and later relocated to a 5-storey purpose-built facility in Bothwell Street. The firm also opened offices in Liverpool (1840), London (1845) and Manchester (1886). In 1851, MacLure, MacDonald & Co imported a Sigl machine from Germany which was capable of printing 600 sheets an hour and the firm is believed to be the first in the UK to use steam power for lithographic printing. 

MacLure, MacDonald & Co. survived until 1992 when its assets were acquired by J R Reid Printers of Blantyre.

Gallery

References

Further reading
 Williams, L. N. and M. A Century Of Stamp Production, 1852-1952. London: Waterlow & Sons, Limited, 1952 44p.

External links

Glasgow School of Art Archives: Picture of Andrew Maclure in full dress kilt, photographed by Duncan Brown c 1856.
Neil Bruckman - A British Telephone Stamp of 1884
Portraits at the National Portrait Gallery by Maclure & Macdonald

Printing companies of the United Kingdom
British companies established in 1835
Publishing companies established in 1835